Colin Percy Stannard (born 8 February 1924) was Archdeacon of Carlisle and a residentiary canon at Carlisle Cathedral from 1984 to 1993.

He was educated at Woodbridge School and Selwyn College, Cambridge; and, after World War II service with the Royal Norfolk Regiment, ordained in 1950. After a curacy at St Edmundsbury Cathedral he served incumbencies in Grimsby, Barrow-in-Furness, Upperby, Gosforth and Natland before his Carlisle appointments.

Notes
 

 

1924 births
People educated at Woodbridge School
Alumni of Selwyn College, Cambridge
Somerset Light Infantry officers
Archdeacons of Carlisle
Living people
British Army personnel of World War II
Royal Norfolk Regiment officers